Zekes was a dansband, established in January 2009 in Skara, Sweden. The band participated at Dansbandskampen 2009, where they reached the final. On 27 December 2009, the song "I ett fönster" entered Svensktoppen.

In June 2012, SR Skaraborg announced that the band was to become disestablished following the 2012 summer tour, with their final appearance at Matfestivalen in Skövde in August that year.

Members
Rickard Carlsson (vocals, guitar)
Mathias Johansson (bass)
Jakob Stenseke (saxophone, guitar, vocals)
Anton Johansson (keyboard, saxophone, vocals)
Simon Warnskog (drums)

Discography

Albums

Singles

Svensktoppen songs
I ett fönster- 2009

Svensktoppen test (failed to enter chart)
Vi lyfter igen-2011
Samma sak- 2012

References

2009 establishments in Sweden
2012 disestablishments in Sweden
Dansbands
Musical groups established in 2009
Musical groups disestablished in 2012